The Eisack (or ) is a river in Northern Italy, the second largest river in South Tyrol. Its source is near the Brenner Pass, at an altitude of about 1990 m above sea level. The river draws water from an area of about 4,200 km². After about 96 km, it joins the Adige river south of Bolzano. At first the river flows through the Wipptal and after the village of Vahrn through the Eisacktal. Its source is sung of in the Bozner Bergsteigerlied as the northern frontier of the South Tyrolean homeland.

The major towns and villages along the course of the river are Sterzing, Franzensfeste, Brixen, Klausen, Waidbruck and finally the capital city of the province. In Brixen it merges with the Rienz. Several smaller creeks are tributaries, including the Ridnauner Bach, the Pflerscher Bach, the Pfitscher Bach, the Villnößer Bach, the Derjon, the Braibach (also known as Tierser Bach), the Eggentaler Bach and the Talfer flowing from Sarntal.

The Eisack is used extensively for the production of electricity; it is dammed near Franzensfeste, Klausen and Waidbruck.

External links

 Eisack Water quality report 

Rivers of South Tyrol
Rivers of Italy